The Bougainville honeyeater (Stresemannia bougainvillei) is a species of bird in the family Meliphagidae. It is monotypic within the genus Stresemannia.
It is endemic to Bougainville Island.  Its natural habitats are subtropical or tropical moist lowland forests and subtropical or tropical moist montane forests.

References

Meliphagidae
Birds of Bougainville Island
Birds described in 1932
Taxonomy articles created by Polbot
Endemic fauna of Papua New Guinea